Julio Ponce Lerou is a Chilean billionaire who is the principal shareholder of  Soquimich.
He is a former son-in-law of Augusto Pinochet. Until 1982 he was president of Chilean state-owned forestry company Complejo Forestal y Maderero Panguipulli while he was simultaneously president of CELCO, a wood pulp company.

Ponce is currently accused of a millionaire fraud and embezzlement that affects the pension funds of millions of Chilean citizens under what is known as the "Cascadas" case.

In his youth, he attended the University of Concepción, where studied medicine for a year. Then, he finished his Bachelor of Arts at the University of Chile.

See also
Crony capitalism

References

Year of birth missing (living people)
Place of birth missing (living people)
Living people
Chilean billionaires
Chilean businesspeople
Chilean businesspeople in mining
Chilean foresters
Chilean businesspeople in timber
Pinochet family
University of Concepción alumni
University of Chile alumni